Husband and Wife (Italian: Marito e moglie) is a 1952 Italian comedy film written, directed and starred by Eduardo De Filippo. It also features Tina Pica, Titina De Filippo and Luciana Vedovelli.

Cast
 Eduardo De Filippo as Matteo Cuomo / Gennaro Imparato
 Titina De Filippo as Concetta Imparato
 Ellida Lorini as  Teresinella
 Tina Pica as Rosalia / Fedora
 Luciana Vedovelli as Anna Maria 
 Giuseppe Pica as Il figlio scemo 
 Vittorio Caprioli
 Riccardo Frera
 Amedeo Girardi
 Sergio Corti

References

Bibliography
 Frank Burke. A Companion to Italian Cinema. John Wiley & Sons, 2017.

External links
 

1952 films
Films scored by Nino Rota
1950s Italian-language films
Italian comedy films
1952 comedy films
Italian black-and-white films
1950s Italian films